Nemyshlyanskyi District is an urban district of the city of Kharkiv, Ukraine, named after a neighborhood in the city Nemyshlya.

The district is the newest being created in 1973 out of portions of Moskovskyi, Ordzhonikidzevskyi, and Kominternivskyi as Frunzenskyi. In 2016 it was renamed to its current name to comply with decommunization laws.

Places
 Nemyshlya
 Horbany
 Pavlenky
 Fedortsi
 Novo-Zakhidnyi
 Saltivka: Druhe Saltivske selyshche, Tretye Saltivske selyshche,
 micro-districts: 624, 625, 626, 627

References

 
Urban districts of Kharkiv